Christine Kamp (1966 in Strasbourg, France) is a Dutch organist & pianist.

Biography 
She studied organ and piano at the Sweelinck Conservatory in Amsterdam, as well as organ, church music, chamber music and lied accompaniment at the Utrecht conservatory. Her organ teachers included Ewald Kooiman, Jacques van Oortmerssen and Jan Raas. Ronald Brautigam and Thom Bollen were among her piano teachers. She attended courses with György Sebők and Marie-Louise Jaquet-Langlais.
Christine Kamp has performed in the Netherlands (e.g. Concertgebouw Amsterdam and Sint-Bavokerk Haarlem), abroad (St. Clotilde, Paris), and has done recordings for radio, TV and CD. She gave the Dutch premiere (and first performance since 1928) of the Pièce Symphonique by Louis Vierne with the Holland Symfonia Orchestra conducted by Ermanno Florio in 2006.
She has been the organist of the Grote Kerk at Weesp since 1996.

Discography 
Louis Vierne Complete organ works (2CD) Vol.1, 2, 3, 4 (5 not recorded): including complete choral works, transcriptions, organ with chant, brass & orchestra
Christine Kamp Sauer organ Hermannstadt/Sibiu Romania Vol.1, 2

Awards 
In 2002, Christine Kamp was decorated with the Silver Medal of the Société Académique 'Arts Sciences Lettres' in Paris, and in 2008, with the Weesper Cultuurprijs.

References & Sources 
Article 
Interview 
Interview radio

External links 
Christine Kamp 

1966 births
Living people
Dutch classical organists
Conservatorium van Amsterdam alumni
Musicians from Strasbourg
Date of birth missing (living people)
Women organists
20th-century organists
20th-century Dutch musicians
20th-century classical musicians
20th-century women musicians
21st-century organists
21st-century Dutch musicians
21st-century classical musicians
21st-century women musicians